Paraíba is a state in northeastern Brazil. It may also refer to:

Places
Paraíba do Sul, Rio de Janeiro, a municipality in southeastern Brazil 
Paraíba Valley, a region in the states of São Paulo and Rio de Janeiro, Brazil
Metropolitan Region of Vale do Paraíba e Litoral Norte, a metropolitan region in southeastern Brazil

Rivers
Paraíba do Norte River, northeastern Brazil
Paraíba do Meio River, in northeastern Brazil
Paraíba do Sul, southeastern Brazil

Other uses
USS Davidson (FF-1045) or Paraíba, a Brazilian destroyer